.mq is the Internet country code top-level domain (ccTLD) for Martinique. 

The .mq top-level domain was managed by SYSTEL until SYSTEL was bought by Mediaserv. The registration services were later reopened, with the country code's current technical contact changing to Canal+ Telecom in Guadeloupe.

See also
 Internet in France
 ISO 3166-2:MQ
 .fr –CC TLD for the French Republic
 .eu –CC TLD for the European Union

External links 
 IANA .mq whois information
 DOMeNIC's website
 

Country code top-level domains
Communications in Martinique

sv:Toppdomän#M